Maryland Terrapins basketball may refer to:
Maryland Terrapins men's basketball
Maryland Terrapins women's basketball